

Herbert Rieckhoff (25 December 1898 – 30 November 1948) was a German general during World War II. He was a recipient of the Knight's Cross of the Iron Cross of Nazi Germany.

Awards and decorations

 Knight's Cross of the Iron Cross on 5 July 1941 as Oberst and Geschwaderkommodore of Kampfgeschwader 2
 German Cross in Gold on 27 July 1943 as Oberst im Generalstab (in the General Staff) of Luftflotte 1

References

Citations

Bibliography

 
 

1898 births
1948 deaths
Military personnel from Berlin
People from the Province of Brandenburg
German Army personnel of World War I
Luftwaffe World War II generals
Recipients of the clasp to the Iron Cross, 1st class
Recipients of the Gold German Cross
Recipients of the Knight's Cross of the Iron Cross
Recipients of the Order of the Cross of Liberty, 1st Class
German prisoners of war in World War II
Prussian Army personnel
German police officers
Lieutenant generals of the Luftwaffe